Lo Stato (Italian: The State) was a monthly political and finance magazine which existed in the Fascist Italy between 1930 and 1943. Its susbtitle was Rivista di scienze politiche e giuridiche.

History and profile
Lo Stato was started in Rome in 1930. Its founders were Ettore Rosboch and Carlo Costamagna. The magazine was published first bimonthly, but from 1931 its frequency was switched to monthly. Its major contributors were the Italian economists, including Celestino Arena, Gino Arias, Gino Borgatta, Giuseppe Bottai, Gustavo Del Vecchio, Giuseppe Ugo Papi and Franco Modigliani. The magazine folded in 1943.

References

1930 establishments in Italy
1943 disestablishments in Italy
Bi-monthly magazines published in Italy
Defunct political magazines published in Italy
Fascist newspapers and magazines
Italian-language magazines
Magazines established in 1930
Magazines disestablished in 1943
Magazines published in Rome
Monthly magazines published in Italy